Angelo Luca Nehme (born 23 January 2004) is a Danish professional footballer who plays as a winger for Danish club Horsens.

Club career 
Coming from Ikast's youth sector, Nehme joined the Midtjylland Academy in 2019. In October 2020, he moved to Horsens's youth sector, signing a three-year contract.

Nehme made his senior debut on 24 May 2021, as a starter in a Danish Superliga game against OB.

International career 
Nehme was selected to train for the Denmark national under-17 team in September 2020.

Career statistics

Club

References

External links 
 
 
 

2004 births
Living people
Danish men's footballers
Association football wingers
Ikast FS players
FC Midtjylland players
AC Horsens players
Danish Superliga players